The EU Independent Fiscal Institutions Network (EU IFIs) is a voluntary and inclusive institution open to all independent fiscal oversight bodies operating in the EU. It provides a platform to exchange views, expertise and pool resources in areas of common concern. It was formally created in September 2015 following the meeting of EU fiscal oversight bodies.

The Network supports the efforts to review and reinforce the EU fiscal framework, seeking to better exploit the synergies between rules and institutions, as well as between different levels of administration whilst respecting the principle of subsidiarity and enhancing local ownership and accountability.

The network is currently headed by Sander van Veldhuizen, Chair of the CPB Netherlands Bureau for Economic Policy Analysis. The Secretariat is managed by the Centre for European Policy Studies (CEPS).

Chairs 
 José Luis Escrivá (2015–2019)
 Seamus Coffey (2019–2020)
 Sander van Veldhuizen (2020–2021)
 Richard van Zwol (2021–)

Participating bodies

See also 
 Parliamentary Budget Office (Australia)
 Court of Audit (Belgium)
 Parliamentary Budget Officer (Canada)
 National Assembly Budget Office (Korea)
 Congressional Budget Office (United States)
 CPB Netherlands Bureau for Economic Policy Analysis (Netherlands)
 Independent Authority for Fiscal Responsibility (Spain)
 Office for Budget Responsibility (United Kingdom)

References

External links
Official website

Eurozone
Policy and political reactions to the Eurozone crisis
Fiscal federalism
2015 in the European Union
Multi-speed Europe
United Kingdom budgets